Wolfgang Achtner (2 September 1957 – 31 October 2017) was a theologist who played a key role as an ambassador for the science-and-religion dialogue in Germany.

Career
Achtner studied systematic theology and the Old Testament in Mainz, Göttingen, and Heidelberg. His dissertation focused on the science-and-religion dialogue in the work of Thomas F. Torrance. He then undertook a one-year research fellowship in Heidelberg. While a parish minister in Mainz, he earned an additional degree in mathematics.

He worked on the concept of natural law and its role in the science and theology dialogue during a sabbatical year at Princeton Theological Seminary.

He won the Kleines Lutherstipendium for the translation of his own book Dimensionen der Zeit into English (Dimensions of Time, 2002).

He founded the Local Society Initiative Group at Giessen, and won a stipend for the Templeton Oxford Seminars in Science and Christianity. He was a member of ESSAT and the Protestant Academy of Arnoldshain. He lectured in Germany, France, Great Britain, Switzerland, and the United States. Achtner was editor of the Giessen University Sermons and the newsletter Science and Religion (in German).

Publications

Books
 Dimensionen der Zeit: die Zeitstrukturen Gottes, der Welt, und des Menschen Wolfgang Achtner, Stefan Kunz, Thomas Walter, Primus, 1998 , translated as Dimensions of time: the structures of the time of humans, of the world, and of God W.B. Eerdmans Pub., 2002 
 Künstliche Intelligenz und menschliche Person, Vol 91 of Marburger theologische Studien, Elwert, 2006 
 Vom Erkennen zum Handeln: Die Dynamisierung von Mensch und Natur im ausgehenden Mittelalter als Voraussetzung für die Entstehung naturwissenschaftlicher Rationalität Vol 12 of Religion, Theologie und Naturwissenschaft, Vandenhoeck & Ruprecht, 2008 
 Physik, Mystik und Christentum: Eine Darstellung und Diskussion der natürlichen Theologie bei T.F. Torrance, Vol 438 of Europäische Hochschulschriften, P. Lang, 1991 
  Gott - Geist - Gehirn: Religiöse Erfahrungen im Lichte der neuesten Hirnforschung, Vol 133 of Arnoldshainer Texte, Haag + Herchen, 2005 
 Die Chaostheorie: Geschichte, Gestalt, Rezeption, EZW-Texte ; 135 Evangel. Zentralstelle für Weltanschauungsfragen, 1997

References 

1957 births
2017 deaths
20th-century German Protestant theologians
Johannes Gutenberg University Mainz alumni
German male non-fiction writers
German theologians
 German expatriates in the United States
 German expatriates in the United Kingdom
 German expatriates in Switzerland
 German expatriates in France
People from Limburg-Weilburg